Pique macho is a Bolivian dish consisting of beef, red onion, green pepper, tomato, french fries, mustard, mayonnaise, and ketchup. Depending on the region it is cooked, boiled egg may also be included.

Smaller portions are simply called pique; pique macho is a huge portion, and traditionally spicy hot because of the pimenton. Urban legend suggests that this is because you are macho if you can finish one by yourself, though most diners opt to share the dish amongst a pair or a group. 

Another legend says that a group of workers, late at night, drunk, were hungry. The owner of the restaurant said they were closing and had nothing. The group of workers insisted that they would eat anything. The owner proceeded to chop what she had left of the ingredients that constitute the pique macho and served them really spicy to help with their drunkenness. She then said "Piquen" si son "machos", eat it if you think you're man enough, and that is how it got the name of Pique Macho.

The "Pique Macho" or "Pique a lo Macho" was created by Mr. Honorato Quinones and his wife Evangelina Gomez Quinones,  owners of "Restaurante Miraflores" in Cochabamba, Bolivia .

Ingredients

Basic Ingredients:

beef
salt
oil
red onion
green pepper
tomato
french fries

(optional)
boiled eggs

External links
BoliviaNet's Pique Macho Recipe

Bolivian cuisine